The electoral district of Bass is one of the electoral districts of Victoria, Australia, for the Victorian Legislative Assembly. It includes the suburbs and towns of Bass, Cape Paterson, Clyde, Corinella, Cowes, Grantville, Inverloch, Kilcunda, Koo Wee Rup, Lang Lang, Pearcedale, Rhyll, San Remo, Tooradin, Ventnor and Wonthaggi. It lies within the Eastern Victoria Region of the upper house, the Legislative Council.

Bass was created in a redistribution for the 2002 election. It largely replaced the abolished electorate of Gippsland West, held by independent Susan Davies.  However, the seat is located in traditional Liberal territory. Its predecessors, Gippsland West and Westernport, had historically been strongholds for the conservative parties. On the new boundaries it was marginally Liberal on a "traditional" two-party basis. Davies contested Bass, but was defeated by Liberal candidate Ken Smith, who had been the member for the relevant Legislative Council seat of Gippsland Province since 1988. Smith's win was the only Liberal gain in an election which saw Labor score its biggest-ever victory in Victoria.

Smith was reelected in 2006 election with a modest swing in his favour. He was reelected handily at the 2010 election, picking up a swing large enough to revert Bass to a safe Liberal seat, as Gippsland West had been. He subsequently served as Speaker of the Victorian Legislative Assembly from 2010 to 2014.

Smith retired at the 2014 state election after losing the speakership in February 2014, when he lost the support of balance of power independent MP Geoff Shaw. Brian Paynter, a local accountant, succeeded him as Liberal candidate and member for Bass. However, Paynter was swept out after only one term by Labor's Jordan Crugnale, who became the first Labor member ever to win the seat or its predecessors.

Members for Bass

Election results

References

External links
 Electorate profile: Bass, Victorian Electoral Commission

2002 establishments in Australia
Electoral districts of Victoria (Australia)
City of Casey
Shire of Cardinia
Bass Coast Shire